Pachypodium geayi is a species of Pachypodium that originated from Southwest Madagascar. It has a metallic grey pachycaul trunk and the leaves are thin and grey-green, with a bright pink mid-rib. The plant has white flowers.  Pachypodium geayi is one of the largest of the Madagascar species.

Gallery

References

geayi
Endemic flora of Madagascar